Diston is a surname. Notable people with the surname include:

Adam Marshall Diston (1893–1956), journalist, British Union of Fascists member, and ghostwriter for Winston Churchill
Josiah Diston (1667–1737), English banker and politician
Jay Diston (born 1990), Canadian football player